Jaworzno  is a city in southern Poland, near Katowice. It lies in the Silesian Highlands, on the Przemsza river (a tributary of the Vistula). Jaworzno belongs to the historic province of Lesser Poland. The city is situated in the Silesian Voivodeship since its formation in 1999, previously (1975–1999) it was in Katowice Voivodeship. Jaworzno is one of the cities of the 2,7 million conurbation – Katowice urban area and within a greater Silesian metropolitan area populated by about 5,294,000 people. The population of the city is 89,350 (2021).

Geography

Location
The municipality is situated a short distance to the north-east of Junction 41 on the A4 Highway. It lies in the Silesian Highlands, in the historical region of Lesser Poland, and since its foundation until 1975, it was administratively tied with Lesser Poland's capital, Kraków. Until 1795, it belonged to Kraków Voivodeship, then, together with Kraków, was seized by the Habsburg Empire in the Partitions of Poland. In 1815–1846 it belonged to the Free City of Kraków, which was annexed by Austria and merged with Kingdom of Galicia and Lodomeria. In 1918 Jaworzno returned to Poland. The name of the city comes from the jawor trees (sycamore maple), which in the past were abundant in this area.

Administrative position
Jaworzno was placed into the Silesian Voivodeship (province) effective January 1, 1999 under the Local Government Reorganization Act. Previously, it was attached to the Katowice Voivodeship (1975–1998) and before that to the Kraków Voivodeship. Jaworzno lies in the east of the largest metropolis in Poland and one of the largest in the European Union, numbering about 3,5 million. This urban expansion bloomed in the 19th century thanks to the rapid development of mining and metallurgical industries. In 2006 Jaworzno and 14 neighboring cities formed a multimunicipal structure, the Upper Silesian Metropolitan Union.

Climate
The climate of the area is continental humid. The area's characteristic weak winds blow at about 2 m/s from the west (Moravian Gate).

Transport
 Routes
Jaworzno is located at the intersection of a number of road routes such as the A4 motorway (part of European route E40), the S1 expressway which is connected with the A1 motorway (both forming part of the European route E75), the National road No. 79 (Warsaw–Bytom), and Voivodeship road 903.
 Public transport

Public transport is provided by PKM Jaworzno (Przedsiębiorstwo Komunikacji Miejskiej w Jaworznie – public transport company in Jaworzno) not belonging to the KZK GOP. PKM Jaworzno was one of the first public transport companies in Poland which introduced the magnetic card called Jaworznicka Karta miejska (Jaworzno Urban Card) instead of paper tickets. Currently PKM Jaworzno is one of the most modern public transport companies in Poland. The PKM Jaworzno's fleet is based 40% on electric vehicles.

Districts and housing estates

Bory
Byczyna
Cezarówka
Ciężkowice
Dąbrowa Narodowa
Długoszyn
Dobra
Gigant
Góra Piasku
Jeleń
Jeziorki
Koźmin
Niedzieliska
Pieczyska
Siłownia
Podwale
Stara Huta
Stare Miasto (Old City)
Szczakowa
Śródmieście (Downtown)
Wilkoszyn
Wysoki Brzeg
Osiedle Stałe
Osiedle Awaryjne
Osiedle Cegielniana
Osiedle Chrząstówka
Osiedle Energetyków
Osiedle Gagarina
Osiedle Górnicze
Osiedle Kościuszki
Osiedle Warpie
Osiedle Leopold
Osiedle Łubowiec
Osiedle Pańska Góra
Osiedle Podłęże
Osiedle Skałka
Osiedle Pszczelnik
Osiedle Sobieski

History
In the Middle Ages, a gord was established on the Grodzisko hill, traces of which can still be found. First known mention of Jaworzno comes from the year 1229, and in 1335, a parish church of St. Wojciech existed here. Jaworzno remained a small village, located in western Lesser Poland, near the much larger and more important town of Chrzanów. From 1179, the nearby Przemsza river marked the border between Lesser Poland and Silesia. It also became a state border of Poland until 1922. The area of Jaworzno was originally under the rule of the bishops of Kraków. After Austria seized Silesia at the end of the 17th century, several coal mines were developed near Jaworzno. In the 18th century, deposits of silver, lead, iron and zinc were found here. In 1767, first coal mine in the Polish–Lithuanian Commonwealth was opened in Szczakowa.

After the Partitions of Poland Jaworzno belonged to the Habsburg Empire. In 1809 – 1815 it was part of the Duchy of Warsaw, and in 1815–1846, it belonged to the Free City of Krakow, which in 1846 was annexed by the Austrian Empire. Jaworzno remained in Austrian Galicia until November 1918. In the 19th century, the village became famous for the so-called Three Emperors' Corner, where borders of three powers met (German Empire, Russian Empire and Austria-Hungary). In 1847 a new railway line connects Jaworzno's Szczakowa district with Kraków and Prussian Upper Silesia. The village became a center of industrialization. A power plant was opened in 1898, and Jaworzno's coal mines extracted 84% of Galician coal. Several new factories were established here in the late 19th and early 20th century. As a result, on September 21, 1901, Emperor Franz Joseph I granted a town charter to Jaworzno.

Following World War I, in 1918, Poland regained independence and control of the town. In the Second Polish Republic, Jaworzno belonged to the Kraków Voivodeship, in which it also remained after the war, until 1975.

Following the joint German-Soviet invasion of Poland, which started World War II in September 1939, the town was occupied by Germany. The Germans operated several forced labour camps in the town, including a Nazi prison/forced labour camp, a subcamp of the Auschwitz concentration camp and the E596 subcamp of the Stalag VIII-B/344 prisoner-of-war camp for Western Allied POWs at the Jan Kanty Coal Mine (under occupation named Dachsgrube), and the E561, E563 and E732 subcamps of Stalag VIII-B/344, located at a local railway depot, at the Sobieski Coal Mine (then renamed Robertsgrube) and in the present-day district of Szczakowa, respectively.

After the war, the town was restored to Poland, although with a Soviet-installed communist regime, which stayed in power until the Fall of Communism in the 1980s. The communists converted the former Nazi German subcamp of Auschwitz into the Central Labour Camp Jaworzno. In the People's Republic of Poland Jaworzno developed as an important center of industry. Its population quickly grew, when thousands of migrants came here in search of work at coal mines, power plants and other factories. Furthermore, several villages were integrated with Jaworzno. As a result, Jaworzno's area reaches . In 1975 the city became part of Katowice Voivodeship. Despite the fact that most towns of pre-1975 Chrzanów County returned to Lesser Poland, Jaworzno was attached to the Silesian Voivodeship in 1999.

Environment

Greens, forests, and undeveloped land constitute 60 percent of the town's area. Jaworzno has environmentally valuable areas which as a group present a diversity of landscapes and vegetation as well as a richness of flora and fauna. These include the Dolina Zabnika nature reserve, the Dobra Wilkoszyn landscape protection area, the Sasanka natural surface monument, Grodzisko hill, and Sosina lake. Within Jaworzno's boundaries there are 41 plant species under strict protection and 11 under partial protection.

Media

 Online News
 Jaw.pl
 Jaworzno.naszemiasto.pl
 Mojejaworzno.pl
 TV Station
 DlaCiebie.TV 
 Newspapers
 Co Tydzień
 Tydzień w Jaworznie
 Extra
 Sokół Jaworznicki

Sport and culture

The city of Jaworzno has many sporting facilities at the Europe-wide level and offers a rich variety of educational and cultural activities. The city major arena, the Hala Widowiskowo-Sportowa, can seat 2,500 spectators. The Sosina water sports centre is the venue for the annual Polish water-skiing championships.

Football
Szczakowianka Jaworzno – football team (1st league 2002/2003)
GKS Victoria Jaworzno – Poland's oldest miner's team
The Puma Youth Academy (Akademia Los Puma) – football team (Junior league 2012/2013)

Notable people
Shelomo Selinger (born 1924), Polish-Jewish sculptor
Andrzej Stalmach (1942–2020), athlete
Basia Trzetrzelewska (born 1954), singer and songwriter
Bogdan Wołkowski (born 1957), professional billiards player
Andrzej Karweta (1958–2010), Polish Navy Admiral
Jan Urban (born 1962), footballer
Wojciech Saługa (born 1969), economist and politician
Paweł Sarna (born 1977), poet
Grzegorz Proksa (born 1984), boxer

Twin towns – sister cities

Jaworzno is twinned with:
 Hereford, England, United Kingdom
 Karviná, Czech Republic
 Szigethalom, Hungary
 Yiwu, China

References
Notes

External links

 Official web site of Jaworzno
 Popular web site about Jaworzno
 Community portal of the Jaworzno City
 Jewish Community in Jaworzno on Virtual Shtetl
 City Public Library in Jaworzno 
 City Museum

 
Jaworzno
Jaworzno
Kraków Voivodeship (14th century – 1795)
Kingdom of Galicia and Lodomeria
Kraków Voivodeship (1919–1939)